Tipalti is an accounting software financial technology business that provides accounts payable, procurement and global payments automation software for businesses.
Tipalti is headquartered in Foster City, CA , with offices in London UK, Vancouver Canada, Toronto Canada, Amsterdam Netherlands, Plano Texas, and R&D in Glil-Yam Israel.

History 
Tipalti was founded in 2010 by Chen Amit and Oren Zeev and launched its first payment product in 2011. The company is a licensed money transmitter in every state that requires it in the United States, including California, New York, and Texas. Tipalti also has an FCA-approved electronic money (E-money) license to provide payment services for companies based in the United Kingdom.

In 2014, the company released a supplier portal component to enable Accounts Payable departments to automate payments to suppliers, vendors, and independent contractors.

In October 2014, Tipalti's CEO Chen Amit stated that the company was processing payments to approximately 300,000 payees and between $1 billion to $1.5 billion annually in payments.

In February 2018, the company announced support for multi-subsidiary AP management and purchase order matching as part of its invoice processing functionality.

In August 2018, Tipalti announced that its platform processed $5 billion in payments annually and served over 3,000,000 payees.

In October 2018, the company announced an integration with  QuickBooks Online.

In February 2019, Tipalti announced that they now process over $6.5 billion in annual transactions for more than 4 million suppliers, the hiring of 2 additional executives, and that they doubled new business growth between July 1 and December 31, 2018, relative to the same period in 2017.

On February 26, 2019, Tipalti announced the launch of the Tipalti Multi-FX service, to help finance teams manage FX currency conversion across over 30 currencies.

In August 2019, Tipalti announced that they had surpassed $8 billion in annual transactions processed through their platform, while making the Inc. 5000 list for the second consecutive year and increasing bookings in first half 2019 by 250% relative to first half 2018.

On January 22, 2020, Tipalti announced that it will be opening offices in Vancouver, B.C., Canada. This is the third global office for Tipalti, joining existing locations in San Mateo, California and Kibbutz Glil-Yam, Israel.

On February 19, 2020, Tipalti announced that it had surpassed $10 billion in annual transactions. This achievement coincides with Tipalti exceeding 900 customers, once again doubling new customer bookings in 2019. Tipalti also added 65 new team members during the second half of 2019 with 240 employed as of Jan 1, 2020.

On July 14, 2020, Tipalti announced that it had surpassed $11 billion in annual transactions. This achievement coincides with Tipalti exceeding 1,000 customers, while growing over 80% relative to first half 2019. Tipalti also added over 50 new team members, reaching over 300 employees, during the first half of 2020 and said it planned to hire an additional 100 by the end of 2020.

On January 26, 2021 Tipalti announced that it had been named a Leader in the IDC MarketScape: Worldwide SaaS and Cloud-Enabled Midmarket Accounts Payable Applications 2020-2021 Vendor Assessment report.

On February 24, 2021, Tipalti announced that it grew revenue by more than 85% and increased annualized transactions to more than $18 Billion.

On April 12, 2021, Tipalti announced its acquisition of Approve.com, a cloud procurement solutions provider, to expand its portfolio of financial operations offerings.

On July 14, 2021, Tipalti announced it increased its revenue by 83% in the first half of 2021 compared to the same period in 2020. It also surpassed its annualized transaction volume to $23 billion. The company also announced the hiring of Paco Suro from Shopify and Twitter to lead its platform economy business as general manager. 

On December 8, 2021, Tipalti announced a $270-million Series F round of funding, with a valuation of $8.3 billion. It also announced that it reached $30 billion in annualized transaction volume. 

On February 23, 2022, Tipalti announced that it had surpassed $36 billion in annual transactions with 100% year-over-year payment volume growth.

On September 14, 2022, Tipalti announced that it has introduced the Tipalti Card for its customers' corporate spend. The company says that the card enables automatic credit card reconciliation, while allowing customers to manage cards alongside their other supplier payment methods in one place.

On September 15, 2022, Tipalti announced that it had surpassed 2,500 customers and 1,000 employees. The company also opened new offices in the Netherlands to serve the mainland Europe market. Robert Israch was promoted from CMO / GM Europe to President. Todd McGuire was promoted to Chief Human Resources Officer. Paul Henderson, formerly Tipalti's Global Controller, was appointed Chief Accounting Officer.

On March 1, 2023, Tipalti announced it grew its overall customer base to more than 3,000 while achieving a 98% customer retention rate for the fifth year in a row, helping total transactions to soar by 50% for a total payments volume of $43 billion. In 2022, the company was named to the Inc. 5000 list and Deloitte Fast 500 list for the fifth consecutive year, and was also awarded the “Top-Rated Accounts Payable Software” by TrustRadius; named to its first-ever “MES Matters: Key Vendors Serving the Midmarket” list; and received recognition as Spend Matters’ "50 to Know” for the third consecutive year. 

In 2023, Tipalti was selected as a finalist for TrustRadius’ 2023 Winter Award in Accounts Payable in three categories – Best Relationship, Best Value for Price and Best Feature Set – and was also cited as a “Best in Class” vendor in Aite’s January 2023 report, “Aite Matrix: Accounts Payable Automation Solutions.”

Funding 
Tipalti has raised around $550 million in total funding, with a valuation of $8.3 billion.

References 

Payment service providers
Companies based in San Mateo, California
Financial services companies established in 2010
2010 establishments in California